Received Payment is a 1922 American silent drama film directed by Charles Maigne and starring Corinne Griffith, Kenneth Harlan, and David Torrence.

Cast
 Corinne Griffith as Celia Hughes
 Kenneth Harlan as Cary Grant
 David Torrence as Daniel Milton
 William David as Dunbar
 Charles Hammond as Andrew Ferris
 Henry Sedley as Roger Dayne
 Regina Quinn as Felice Huxley
 Dorothy Walters as Mrs. Starr
 Dan Duffy as Starr

References

Bibliography
 Munden, Kenneth White. The American Film Institute Catalog of Motion Pictures Produced in the United States, Part 1. University of California Press, 1997.

External links
 

1922 films
1922 drama films
1920s English-language films
American silent feature films
Silent American drama films
American black-and-white films
Films directed by Charles Maigne
Vitagraph Studios films
1920s American films